Trelion is a hamlet southwest of St Stephen in Brannel in Cornwall, England, United Kingdom.

References

Hamlets in Cornwall